Hislop College, Nagpur is one of the oldest colleges in the city of Nagpur. It is affiliated to Rashtrasant Tukadoji Maharaj Nagpur University.

Founder
The college was named after Scottish missionary Stephen Hislop (1817–1863), who was a noted evangelist, educationist and geologist. He worked for 18 years in the Vidarbha Region alongside Robert Hunter, editor of the Encyclopædic Dictionary.

History
Hislop College was established in 1883 in the Mahal area of Nagpur (But today it is in Civil Lines). Though Nagpur was Capital of Central Provinces, until 1882 it had no college.

The college was affiliated to the University of Calcutta until 1904, and later to Allahabad University. In 1923 it was one of six colleges affiliated to the University of Nagpur.

The American pastor, James M. Lawson, Jr., worked as a missionary there in the campus ministry office from 1953 to 1956, studying Gandhian nonviolence and satyagraha, which influenced his movement-building skills. Thereafter he returned to the United States to become a leading intellectual force in the Civil Rights movement.

Research 
The faculty and Students of Hislop College has carried out 60 Research project in a field of Botany, Sociology, Bio Chemistry, Commerce, Physics, Computer Science, Literature (English, Hindi and Marathi) which has been sanctioned by the University and has been working on 15 research projects on Commerce, Botany, History and Sociology.

Notable alumni

Many people from the neighbouring area have completed their education at Hislop College.

They include:

 M. S. Golwalkar, second Sarsanghchalak (Supreme Leader) of the Rashtriya Swayamsevak Sangh.
 Rajkumar Hirani, film maker
 Shahbaz Khan, actor
Shishir Parkhie - A widely acclaimed Indian Ghazal Singer, Composer & Live Performer.
 Anees Ahmed
 Piyush Daruka, Businessman
 Purushottam Bhaskar Bhave, Marathi writer
 Hari Singh Gour, Founder Vice-Chancellor of University of Delhi
 Ashis Nandy, political psychologist
 Nitin Raut, cabinet minister
 Mukul Wasnik, Union Cabinet Minister
 P. V. Narasimha Rao, 9th Prime Minister of India
 Vilas Muttemwar, Member of Parliament
 Pooja Banerjee, Television actress
 B. D. Kulkarni, chemical reaction engineer, Shanti Swarup Bhatnagar laureate
 Madhukar Narhar Chandurkar, Chief Justice of Indian High Courts.

References

 Rashtrasant Tukadoji Maharaj Nagpur University
Educational institutions established in 1883
Universities and colleges affiliated with the Church of North India
Colleges affiliated to Rashtrasant Tukadoji Maharaj Nagpur University
Universities and colleges in Maharashtra
1883 establishments in British India